Dr. Ida Sophia Scudder (December 9, 1870 – May 24, 1960) was a third-generation American medical missionary in India. She dedicated her life to the plight of Indian women and the fight against bubonic plague, cholera and leprosy. In 1918, she started one of Asia's foremost teaching hospitals, the Christian Medical College & Hospital, Vellore, India.

Early life

Ida was born to Dr. John Scudder and his wife, Sophia (née Weld), part of a long line of medical missionaries that started with Ida's grandfather, Rev. Dr. John Scudder Sr. They were members of the Reformed Church in America. Growing up as a child in India, Ida witnessed famine, poverty and disease. She was invited by Dwight Moody to study at his Northfield Seminary in Massachusetts, where she earned a reputation for pranks. Ida initially expected to get married and settle down and to have a family in the United States after seminary. In 1890, Ida went back to India to help her father when her mother was ailing at the mission bungalow at Tindivanam in the Madras Province.

Ida had earlier expressed a resolve not to become a doctor or a medical missionary. But during her stay in India after her return from the US, she had a life-changing experience one night when she witnessed the death of three women who died during childbirth and was unable to help them during the trauma. These women did not want to be treated by male doctors due to their orthodox customs. As there were no female gynaecologists or even a female general physician, these three women could not be treated properly and therefore died. Witnessing the death of women due to lack of a female doctor convinced Ida Sophia that God wanted her to become a female physician to help women of India. She never married and stayed single throughout her life to fulfill her mission.

She graduated from Cornell Medical College, New York City in 1899, as part of the first class that accepted women as medical students. She then headed back to India, fortified with a $10,000 grant from a Mr. Schell, a Manhattan banker, in memory of his wife. With this money, Ida started a tiny medical dispensary and clinic for women at Vellore, 75 miles from Madras. Her father died in 1900, soon after she arrived in India. In two years, she treated 5,000 patients.

Christian Medical College, Vellore

Ida opened the Mary Taber Schell Hospital in 1902. Realizing that it would be impractical to go on alone in her fight to bring better healthcare to South India's women, she decided to open a medical school for girls only. Her decision was viewed skeptically by some and it was told that Ida would have consider herself lucky even if she got at least three women applicants. On the contrary, Ida got 151 applications the first year (1918) and had to turn many away subsequently. At first, the Reformed Church in America was the main backer of the Vellore school, but after Dr. Scudder agreed to make it coeducational, it eventually gained the support of 40 missions.

In 1928, ground was broken for the "Hillsite" medical school campus on 200 acres (0.8 km²) at Bagayam, Vellore. In 1928, Mahatma Gandhi visited the medical school. She traveled a number of times to the United States to raise funds for the college and hospital, raising a total in the millions. In 1945, the college was opened to men as well as women. In 2003 the Vellore Christian Medical Center was the largest Christian hospital in the world, with 2000 beds, and its medical school is now one of the premier medical colleges in India.

Last years
One day in 1953, aged 82, she was at "Hilltop", her bungalow at Kodaikanal, and opened a stack of letters and telegrams. Her name is a famous one in India. A letter once reached her addressed simply, "Dr. Ida, India." But the mail was heavier than usual because friends around the world were congratulating her on winning the Elizabeth Blackwell Citation from the New York Eye and Ear Infirmary, as one of 1952's five outstanding women doctors.

She died on May 23, 1960, aged 89, at her bungalow.

In 1960, Rajendra Prasad, then the President of India, while inaugurating the jubilee celebrations of the Christian Medical College, paid rich tributes to the late Dr. Ida Scudder and hailed her as a “great lady, whose dedication and planned working are exemplary”.

Legacy
 The Ida Scudder School in Viruthampet, Vellore, is named in her honour
In 2019, the American Heritage Girls announced that she would be replacing Lewis and Clark as the Explorer Level Award namesake in their 2020 Handbook.
A commemorative stamp was released by the Department of Posts on August 12, 2000, as part of the centenary celebrations of the Christian Medical College. The First-day cover portrays Dr Ida Scudder

Other
Her niece, Ida B. Scudder (1900–1995), was also a physician
 Dr. Paul Brand, a noted leprosy researcher worked with Dr. Ida Scudder at Vellore.

Biographies
 Graves Dan (2005) Glimpses, issue #113, Christian History Institute, retrieved 9/8/2007 Ida Scudder, A Woman Who Changed Her Mind
Legacy and Challenge: The Story of Dr.  Ida B. Scudder, published by the Scudder Association 
Ida S. Scudder of Vellore: The Life Story of Ida Sophia Scudder by Dr. M. Pauline Jeffery, Wesley Press 1951
With: Ida S. Scudder and her gleam : memorial supplement, 1960–1961, by M. Pauline Jeffery. Vellore : Christian Medical College of Vellore, 1961
Dr. Ida by Dorothy Clarke Wilson 1959
The Doctor Who Never Gave Up by Carolyn Scott 1975
A Thousand Years In Thy Sight by Dorothy Jealous Scudder (1984) Chapters 25-27
Ida Scudder: Healing Bodies Touching Hearts by Janet Benge and Geoff Benge 2003
Dr. Ida Skudder by Veena Gavhankar, Raj Hans Prakashan, 1983 Marathi.
The things that changed her path was not able to save some Hindu and Muslim women who died due to child birth

References

External links
Vellore Christian Medical College and Hospital
Vellore CMCH Ida S. Scudder page
Vellore Christian Medical College Board (USA), Inc.
The Scudder Association
 Ida Sophia Scudder Papers. Schlesinger Library , Radcliffe Institute, Harvard University.
 10th Ida S. Scudder Humanitarian Oration given by Azim Premji in December 2021

Other sources
 From Mission to Church: The Reformed Church in America Mission to India By Eugene P. Heideman, Published by Wm. B. Eerdmans Publishing, 2001, 512 pages.

American Protestant missionaries
Protestant missionaries in India
Weill Cornell Medical College alumni
1870 births
1960 deaths
Female Christian missionaries
Christian medical missionaries
American expatriates in India
American evangelicals
Northfield Mount Hermon School alumni